Kenneth H. Cooper (born March 4, 1931, Oklahoma City) is a doctor of medicine and former Air Force lieutenant colonel from Oklahoma, who pioneered the benefits of doing aerobic exercise for maintaining and improving health. In 1966 he coined the term, and his book Aerobics was published in 1968, which emphasized a point system for improving the cardiovascular system. The popular mass market version was The New Aerobics, published ten years later.

Career
A native of Oklahoma City, Cooper completed a 13-year military career in both the army and air force. During his Air Force career, he devised the simple Cooper test, which could conveniently and quickly establish the fitness level of large numbers of people. Originally the distance run in 12 minutes, it correlated well with the existing concept of VO2 max. Cooper left the Air Force in 1970, when he and his wife, Millie, moved to Dallas to start his companies.

Cooper is the founder of the non-profit research and education organization, The Cooper Institute, which was opened in 1970. Cooper is also the founder of and Chairman at the Cooper Aerobics Center in Dallas and McKinney, Texas, which comprises eight health and wellness entities.

Cooper received the Golden Plate Award of the American Academy of Achievement in 1986.

Cooper developed the Smart Snack Ribbon guidelines in 2003 for the Frito-Lay division of PepsiCo.

Cooper has published 19 books that have sold 30 million copies and been translated into 41 languages. Cooper encouraged millions to become active and helped to launch modern fitness culture. He is known as the "father of aerobics".

He and his wife are parents of a son and daughter. Cooper has written about the importance of Christian religious faith in his life.

Ideas on exercise and training effect
Cooper studied the effect of exercise in the late 1960s and popularized the term "training effect" although that term had been used before. The measured effects were that muscles of respiration were strengthened, the heart was strengthened, blood pressure was sometimes lowered and the total amount of blood and number of red blood cells increased, making the blood a more efficient carrier of oxygen. VO2 Max was increased. He published his ideas in a book, Aerobics in 1968.

The exercise necessary can be accomplished by any aerobic exercise in a wide variety of schedules - Cooper found it best to award "points" for each amount of exercise and require 30 points a week to maintain the Training Effect.

Cooper instead recommended a "12-minute test" (the Cooper test) followed by adherence to the appropriate starting-up schedule in his book. As always, he recommends that a physical exam should precede any exercise program.

The physiological effects of training have received much further study since Cooper's original work. It is now generally considered that effects of exercise on general metabolic rate (post-exercise) are comparatively small and the greatest effect occurs for only a few hours. Though endurance training does increase the VO2 max of many people, there is considerable variation in the degree to which it increases VO2 max between individuals.

See also
Aerobics
Bill Orban
Exercise
Exercise physiology
Physical fitness
 Power walking

Citations

References
Aerobics (1968)
Run for Your Life: Aerobic Conditioning for Your Heart (1974)
The Aerobics Way: New Data on the World's Most Popular Exercise Program (1978)
The New Aerobics (1979)
Aerobics for Women (1982)
The Aerobics Program for Total Well-being: Exercise, Diet, Emotional Balance (1982, 1983)
Fitness for Life, 6 Audio Cassettes (1983)
Aerobics Program (1985)
Running Without Fear (1986)
The New Aerobics for Women (1988)
Preventing Osteoporosis: Dr. Kenneth H. Cooper's Preventive Medicine Program (1989)
Controlling Cholesterol: Dr. Kenneth H. Cooper's Preventative Medicine Program (1989)
Reducing Cholesterol: A Heart-Smart Guide to Low-Fat Eating (No Nonsense Health Guide) (1989)
Overcoming Hypertension: Dr. Kenneth H. Cooper's Preventive Medicine Program (1990)
Kid Fitness: a Complete Shape-up Program From Birth Through High School (1991)
Dr. Kenneth H. Cooper's Antioxidant Revolution (1994)
Its Better To Believe (1995)
Faith-based Fitness The Medical Program That Uses Spiritual Motivation To Achieve Maximum Health And *Add Years To Your Life (1997)
Antioxidant Revolution (1997)
Can Stress Heal? Converting A Major Health Hazard Into A Surprising Health Benefit (1998)
Advanced Nutritional Therapies (1998)
Regaining the Power of Youth at Any Age (1998)
Discoveries (1999)
Controlling Cholesterol the Natural Way Eat Your Way to Better Health With New Breakthrough Food
Matters of the Heart: Adventures in Sports Medicine (2007)
Start Strong, Finish Strong (2007)

External links
Cooper Aerobics Center
Kenneth H. Cooper Biography

1931 births
Living people
American Christian writers
American exercise and fitness writers
Exercise instructors
Military personnel from Oklahoma
Physicians from Oklahoma
United States Air Force Medical Corps officers
United States Army Medical Corps officers
Writers from Oklahoma City